Shapki is the name of several rural localities in Russia:
Shapki, Kirov Oblast, a village in Yumsky Rural Okrug of Svechinsky District in Kirov Oblast; 
Shapki, Leningrad Oblast, a settlement in Shapkinskoye Settlement Municipal Formation of Tosnensky District in Leningrad Oblast
Shapki, Smolensk Oblast, a village in Klyarinovskoye Rural Settlement of Rudnyansky District in Smolensk Oblast